Robert Naegele (23 June 1925 – 9 January 2016) was a German film and television actor.

Filmography
Film
 As Long as You're Near Me (1953)
 Hunting Party (1959) - Thomas Faber
 Jack of Diamonds (1967) - (uncredited)
 Hugo, the Woman Chaser (1969) - Eberhard
 Madame and Her Niece (1969) - Karl
 Herzblatt oder Wie sag' ich's meiner Tochter? (1969) - Lehrer
  (1969) - Timmons
 Ehepaar sucht gleichgesinntes (1969) - Rechtsanwalt
 Die Zelle (1971)
 Eintausend Milliarden (1974) - Serra
 Zwei himmlische Dickschädel (1974) - Reinthaler
  (1976) - Herr Bauer
  (1976)
 Goetz von Berlichingen of the Iron Hand (1979) - Reier Veit
 Der Sheriff von Linsenbach (1984) - Herr Ruckgaber
 Reserl am Hofe (1984) - Pfarrer
 Waller's Last Trip (1989) - Kuiskle
 The NeverEnding Story II: The Next Chapter (1990) - Giant
Television
 Das Kriminalmuseum (1965–1970) - Rudolf Eckert / Polizeimeister Bögelein
 Der Kommissar (1970-1972, TV Series) - Wegener / Werner Heynold
 Tatort (1972-1988, TV Series) - Froschhammer / Herr Mielke / Dr. Richter / Direktor Forster / Staatsanwalt
 Lokaltermin (1973) - Verteidiger
 Das Haus der Krokodile (1976) - Friedrich Mörlin
 I Only Want You To Love Me (1976, TV Movie) - Gerichtsvollzieher
 PS (1976) - Dr. Bach
 Derrick (1980-1995) - Dr. Schröder / Lapper / Herr Ecker
 Polizeiinspektion 1 (1988) - Bankdirektor Graf

References

Bibliography
 Cowie, Peter. Variety International Film Guide 1970. Tantivy Press, 1969.

External links

1925 births
2016 deaths
German male television actors
German male film actors
20th-century German male actors
People from Günzburg (district)